Pool C of the First Round of the 2013 World Baseball Classic was held at Hiram Bithorn Stadium, San Juan, Puerto Rico from March 7 to 10, 2013.

Pool C was a round-robin tournament. Each team played the other three teams once each, with the top two teams advancing to Pool 2.

Standings

Pool C MVP:  Robinson Canó

Results
All times are Atlantic Standard Time (UTC−04:00).

Dominican Republic 9, Venezuela 3

Puerto Rico 3, Spain 0

Dominican Republic 6, Spain 3

Puerto Rico 6, Venezuela 3

Venezuela 11, Spain 6

Dominican Republic 4, Puerto Rico 2

References

External links
Official website

Pool C
World Baseball Classic Pool C
21st century in San Juan, Puerto Rico
International baseball competitions hosted by Puerto Rico
World Baseball Classic Pool C
Sports in San Juan, Puerto Rico